Tania Christina Tetlow is an American lawyer and law professor who has served as president of Fordham University since July 1, 2022. Previously, she was president of Loyola University New Orleans. She is the first woman and the first layperson to hold each of those positions at those two Catholic universities.

At the start of her professional career she clerked for a federal judge and worked as an attorney in private practice. She was an assistant U.S. attorney from 2000 to 2005. She taught law at Tulane University from 2000 to 2015, leading its Domestic Violence Clinic from 2005 to 2014. She held senior administrative positions at Tulane from 2015 to 2018.

Biography

Early life 

Tetlow was born in New York to L. Mulry Tetlow, a clinical psychologist and psychology professor as well as a former Jesuit priest, and Elisabeth Meier Tetlow, a biblical scholar and author. Her parents met while graduate students at Fordham University. She was raised in New Orleans and attended Benjamin Franklin High School there and was a recipient of the National Merit Scholarship. Tetlow attended Tulane University on a Dean's Honor Scholarship beginning at age 16. She was a Truman Fellow in 1991 and graduated cum laude in 1992. She graduated magna cum laude from Harvard Law School in 1995.

Career 

While a student at Tulane, Tetlow served as an aide to former congresswoman and ambassador Lindy Boggs. After graduating from law school, she served as a law clerk to Judge James Dennis of the United States Fifth Circuit Court of Appeals, and from 1996-2000 she was an associate at Phelps Dunbar Law Firm in New Orleans, litigating complex commercial transactions, civil fraud, and representing journalists in first amendment issues. She then served as an assistant United States attorney for the Eastern District of Louisiana, prosecuting violent crimes and major narcotic cases.

In 2005, Tetlow became an Associate Professor and Director of Tulane's Domestic Violence Clinic, where students represented clients escaping violent relationships and protecting their children. She raised $2.3 million in federal grant funds for the clinic. Tetlow organized efforts for criminal justice reform in New Orleans for victims of domestic violence and sexual assault, and has advised several governments around the world. In 2014, she traveled to China as part of a U.S. State Department delegation people-to-people high level exchange. In addition to her involvements with law, she also helped raise $7 million to rebuild libraries following Hurricane Katrina in 2005.

Tetlow started her teaching career in 1998 as a part-time adjunct professor at Loyola University New Orleans College of Law, where she taught a seminar on constitutional law and race. She rose to full professor at Tulane Law School and focused her scholarship on equal protection and discrimination in juror selection. Her research helped create new anti-discrimination policies at the U.S. Department of Justice. In 2015, Tetlow became Associate Provost for International Affairs at Tulane, a newly created position to coordinate the university's international activities, programs and students.

Tetlow was appointed Senior Vice-President and Chief of Staff at Tulane in 2015 and served as the top strategic advisor to the university's president, Michael Fitts. During her time in that role, the university's enrollment, retention and fundraising increased.

Loyola presidency
On May 2, 2018, Tetlow was elected president of Loyola University New Orleans, following the retirement of Kevin Wildes. She was the first female to become president of the university. She was the first non-Jesuit to hold the position.

Tetlow was inaugurated as the 17th president of Loyola on November 16 at Holy Name of Jesus Catholic Church in New Orleans. The inauguration was a two-day celebration that included a missioning mass, an on-campus student event, and the official ceremony. New Orleans Mayor LaToya Cantrell, President Emeritus of Xavier University of Louisiana, Dr. Norman C. Francis, journalist and friend of Tetlow, Cokie Roberts, and Tulane President, Michael Fitts were among the guests who spoke at the inauguration ceremony.

Fordham presidency
On February 10, 2022, Tetlow was named president of Fordham University in New York City effective July 1, 2022. She is the first female and first layperson to be named to that position in its 181-year history.

Personal life 

Tetlow married Gordon Stewart, then a business professor at Xavier University in New Orleans, in 2009.

Notes

References 

21st-century American lawyers
Presidents of Loyola University New Orleans
Tulane University alumni
Harvard University alumni
Tulane University faculty
Tulane University Law School faculty
Lawyers from New Orleans
Living people
Women heads of universities and colleges
Year of birth missing (living people)
21st-century American women lawyers
American women academics